John Horton  may refer to:

 John Horton (footballer) (1902–1984), English footballer with Southampton F.C.
 John Horton (rugby union) (born 1951), English rugby union player
 Jack Horton (1866–1946), English footballer with West Bromwich Albion F.C.
 Jack Horton (footballer, born 1905) (1905–1964), English footballer with Chelsea F.C.
 Johnny Horton (1925–1960), American country music and rockabilly singer
 Johnny Horton (foosball),  American veteran professional table football player
 Griffin (Marvel Comics), the name of a fictional character appearing in American comic books published by Marvel Comics

See also
Jon Horton (disambiguation)
Johnny Horton (disambiguation)